Mueda is a district of the province of Cabo Delgado, in Moçambique. The capital is the town of Mueda.

The district of Mueda is bordered by Mtwara Region to the north by the Tanzania atarvés of the river Rovuma, to the west by the district of Mecula in the province of Niassa, to the south by the districts of Montepuez and Meluco, and to the east by the districts of Muidumbe, Mocimboa da Praia and Nangade.

According to the Census of 2007, the district has 113,742 inhabitants and an area of 14,150 km².

External links
Government profile 

Districts in Cabo Delgado Province